The NCAA Season 98 basketball tournaments are  the basketball tournaments of the National Collegiate Athletic Association (Philippines) for its 2022–23 season. Emilio Aguinaldo College is hosting the tournament for the first time.

The seniors' tournament was held in September 2022, just over three months after Season 97 ended. The juniors' tournament began in January 2023, the first tournament since Season 95, and the COVID-19 pandemic.

Former UAAP basketball commissioner Tonichi Pujante is this season's commissioner.

Tournament format 
After COVID restrictions limited the elimination round to a single round-robin with the introduction of a play-in tournament in the previous season, Season 98 returned to a double round-robin eliminations for the seniors' tournament.

Just like in Season 97, game days are on Tuesdays, Wednesdays, Fridays, Saturdays and Sundays.

For the juniors' tournament, it is a single round-robin tournament.

Teams 
All ten schools are participating.

Coaching changes

Venues 

For the seniors' tournament, Araneta Coliseum in Quezon City hosted the opening day, while Filoil EcoOil Centre in San Juan hosted the remainder of the elimination round. Filoil EcoOil Centre hosted the semifinals, while the NCAA returned to the Araneta Coliseum for the first two games of the Finals. Game 3 of the Finals was held at the Ynares Center in Antipolo, Rizal.

For the juniors' tournament, the Emilio Aguinaldo College Gym in Manila hosted the elimination round, except for the final gameday, which was held at the nearby San Andres Sports Complex, which then hosted all of the playoff games.

Squads 
Each team can have up to 15 players on their roster, with an additional up to three players in the injured reserve list.

The ban of foreign student-athletes first applied in Season 96 (2020) is still in effect, making all players Filipinos.

Seniors' tournament 
The traditional champion vs. season host opening game on September 10 was scrapped when four Letran Knights players contracted COVID-19; replacing that match-up is season hosts EAC going up against the Arellano Chiefs; the host vs. champion game will instead be the final game of the first round. (Subsequent postponements have made this not the final game of the first round.)

Elimination round

Team standings

Match-up results
Two first-round games, Benilde vs. JRU, and JRU vs. San Sebastian, were rescheduled on the early part of the second round. On this table, they're shown as if they occurred before the second round started.

Postponed games 
 Letran vs. EAC rescheduled after four Letran players tested positive for COVID-19.
 San Sebastian's games vs. Lyceum and EAC rescheduled after six San Sebastian players tested positive for COVID-19.
 September 25 games (JRU vs. Benilde and San Beda vs. Perpetual) were rescheduled due to Super Typhoon Karding.
 JRU's games vs. San Sebastian and Benilde after JRU players tested positive for COVID-19. The JRU vs. San Sebastian game has been rescheduled thrice.
 San Beda vs Arellano rescheduled after Arellano players tested positive for COVID-19.
 Games on October 29 (Arellano vs. EAC and San Beda vs. Benilde) and October 30 (Mapua vs. San Sebastian and JRU vs. Letran) have been postponed due to Tropical Storm Paeng.

Scores 
Results on top and to the right of the grey cells are for first-round games; those to the bottom and to the left of it are second-round games.

Bracket

Semifinals 
Letran and Benilde will have the twice-to-beat advantage; with them having to win only once, and while their opponents twice, to advance.

Benilde vs. San Beda 
The Benilde Blazers qualified to its first Final Four in 20 years. San Beda made it to its 17th consecutive Final Four appearance.

Letran vs. Lyceum 
The Letran Knights qualified to its fourth consecutive Final Four. The Lyceum Pirates clinched a Final Four berth after missing out in Season 97.

Finals 
The Finals is a best-of-three series. Benilde qualified to its first Finals appearance in 20 years, while Letran qualified to its third consecutive Finals.

 Finals Most Valuable Player: 
 Coach of the Year:

All-Star Game 

The annual GMA-NCAA All-Star Game was on October 15, 2022, at the Filoil EcoOil Centre. Each team had celebrities and basketball legends. The basketball legends in Team Heroes were Allan Caidic and Jerry Codiñera, while Team Saints had Marlou Aquino and Willie Miller.
 All-Star Game MVP: Nat Cosejo (Team Heroes)
 Celebrity MVP: Raheel Bhyria (Team Heroes)

Awards 
The awards were handed out prior to Game 2 of the Finals at the Araneta Coliseum.

 Most Valuable Player: 
 Rookie of the Year: 
 Mythical Five:
 
 
 
 
 
 Defensive Player of the Year: 
 All-Defensive Team:
 
 
 
 
 
 Most Improved Player: 
 Sportsmanship Award: San Beda Red Lions

Players of the Week 
The Collegiate Press Corps awards a "player of the week" on Mondays for performances on the preceding week.

Statistical leaders 
Statistical leaders' averages after the elimination round.

Season player highs

Team game highs 

Notes

Team season highs

Discipline 
The following were suspended throughout the course of the season:

 Brent Paraiso of the Letran Knights for a disqualifying foul against the Mapúa Cardinals. Served one-game suspension against the San Beda Red Lions.
 Paraiso was given another one-game suspension, this time on their game against the Lyceum Pirates, for actions detrimental to the league.
 Louie Sangalang of the Letran Knights for two technical fouls against the Mapúa Cardinals. Served one-game suspension against the San Beda Red Lions.
 Sangalang was given another one-game suspension, this time on their game against the Lyceum Pirates, for actions detrimental to the league.
 There were reports that Gab Gamboa of the Mapúa Cardinals was banned in the NCAA for life for being an ineligible player after being enrolled in another school (Saint Clare College of Caloocan) outside of the NCAA. Gamboa had already withdrew from the team on September 18. The ban was supposedly reported on October 1. Last Time While Mapua Cardinals Wins on This Opening Day Last September 10, 2022 at The Score of 66-55 + San Beda Red Lions Will Go Up to 4-1 win and Mapua Cardinals 0-6  The NCAA denied that there were penalties already meted on Gamboa himself, with only the forfeiture being confirmed.
 Ralph Robin and King Gurtiza of the EAC Generals was suspended for the rest of the season, while Art Cosa and Joshua Tolentino were suspended  for an undisclosed number of games, by the team for unspecified "team violations". The announcement was prior to the start of the second round.
 Kim Aurin of the Perpetual Altas was suspended for one game against the Letran Knights by the team for unspecified "team violations." Aurin later the left the team midseason and signed with Barangay Ginebra San Miguel 3x3.
 Jacob Shanoda of the San Sebastian Stags for an unsportsmanlike foul against the Letran Knights. Served one-game suspension against the Mapua Cardinals.
 John Amores of the JRU Heavy Bombers was suspended indefinitely for the following acts: intentionally bumping the referee, pointing a finger at the referee, disrespecting the NCAA Management Committee (ManCom) representative, disrespecting court officials, charging towards the bench of CSB, instigating a brawl, making provocative gestures meant to ignite a fight or brawl, and throwing punches against four Benilde players.
 JRU also suspended Amores indefinitely, adding that he will no longer play in the remainder of the current season, and would no longer participate in team activities.
 A week after the incident, JRU announced that Amores has been permanently removed from the team.
 Mark Sangco and CJ Flores of the Benilde Blazers were suspended for two games against the Perpetual Altas and the San Sebastian Stags for disrespecting ManCom representatives during the Amores incident.
 Ryan Arenal and William Sy of the JRU Heavy Bombers were suspended for two games against the San Sebastian Stags and Perpetual Altas for disrespecting ManCom representatives, and Sy was also suspended another game against the Lyceum Pirates for leaving the bench during the Amores incident.
 Jason Tan, Joshua Guiab, Jason Celis, Marwin Dionisio, Jan Abaoag, Jonathan Medina, Karl de Jesus and Christian Gonzales of the JRU Heavy Bombers were suspended for one game against the San Sebastian Stags for entering the court without recognition from table officials during the Amores incident.
 Ladis Lepalam of the Benilde Blazers were suspended for one game against the Perpetual Altas for entering the court without recognition from table officials during the Amores incident.
 Renzo Navarro of the Lyceum Pirates who were ejected in their game against San Sebastian Stags. Served one-game suspension against the JRU Heavy Bombers.
 The three referees who handled the aforementioned incident during the JRU vs. Benilde game were placed under preventive suspension.
 Coach Edgar Macaraya of the San Sebastian Stags was supposed to be suspended for one game for a disqualifying foul for excessive complaining during their game against the Benilde Blazers, but was lifted by the Commissioner's Office; instead, the referees for that game were indefinitely suspended.
 Kobe Monje of the Letran Knights, who was ejected in Game 1 of the Finals against Benilde. Will serve a one-game suspension in Game 2.
 Kyle Tolentino of the Letran Knights will serve a one-game suspension on Game 2 of the Finals after it was found that he was occupying the landing spot of Migs Oczon of the Benilde Blazers, which resulted in an injury.
 Paolo Javillonar of the Letran Knights was reprimanded for his unsportsmanlike behavior when he touched the private part of Will Gozum of the Benilde Blazers and warned that a repetition or commission of a similar offense will merit a stricter penalty. He is to issue a public apology and render community service "as a rehabilitative measure."
 Fran Yu of the Letran Knights was suspended in the Finals' Game 3 due to a disqualifying foul against Benilde Blazers on the second quarter of Game 2. Letran appealed the suspension to the Management Committee, but was denied.
 Brent Paraiso of the Letran Knights was reprimanded for disrespecting game officials in the Finals' Game 2. Video shown Paraiso participating in a chant badmouthing the referees after Yu was ejected.

Juniors' tournament 
The juniors' tournament, last held in 2019 (Season 95), began on February 1, 2023.

The juniors' tournament will also be a qualifying tournament for the 2023 National Basketball Training Center (NBTC) championship, with the champions qualifying. However, with the NCAA championship series being held in the same week as the NBTC championship, the NBTC decided to give the berths given to the NCAA to its losing semifinalists.

Elimination round

Team standings

Match-up results

Scores
Results on top and to the right of the solid cells are for first round games.

Classification playoffs
A four-way tie for the second seed needed a series of one-game playoff games to determine the final seedings.

Playoff #1
The winner advances to the next round and is guaranteed of no less than a #4 seed, the loser is eliminated.

Playoff #2
The winner advances to the next round; the loser is relegated to the 4th seed.

Playoff #3
The winner is the 2nd seed and clinches the twice to beat advantage at the semifinals; the loser is the third seed. This is a de facto game 1 of a best-of-three series between LSGH and San Beda.

Bracket

Semifinals
The top two teams have the twice-to-beat advantage, where they have to be beaten twice, while their opponents just once, to be eliminated.

Letran vs. Malayan
Letran was the first team to clinch a semifinal berth. Malayan qualified to the Final Four by having the second best tiebreaker among the teams tied for second to fourth.

San Beda vs. LSGH
LSGH qualified to the semifinals by virtue of having the best tiebreaker among the four teams tied from second to fourth. San Beda qualified to the Final Four by eliminating San Sebastian in the first classification playoff.

Finals
This is a best-of-three playoff.

Letran qualified to the championship round for the first time since 2009. LSGH clinched its first Finals berth since 2018.

 Finals Most Valuable Player: 
 Coach of the Year:

Awards 
The awards were handed out prior to Game 2 of the Finals at the San Andres Sports Complex.

 Most Valuable Player: 
 Rookie of the Year: 
 Mythical Five:
 
 
 
 
 
 
 Defensive Player of the Year co-awardees,: 

 All-Defensive Team:
 
 
 
 
 
 
 Most Improved Player: 
 Sportsmanship Award: San Beda Red Cubs

Statistical leaders 
Statistical leaders' averages after the elimination round.

Season player highs

Team game highs

Team season highs

See also 
 UAAP Season 85 basketball tournaments

References 

98
2022–23 in Philippine college basketball